Tom Van Asbroeck (born 19 April 1990 in Aalst) is a Belgian cyclist, who currently rides for UCI WorldTeam . He was previously a member of the  team, between 2012 and 2014. He was named in the start list for the 2015 Vuelta a España. In May 2018, he was named in the startlist for the Giro d'Italia. In August 2020, he was named in the startlist for the 2020 Tour de France.

Major results

2011
 1st Omloop Het Nieuwsblad U23
 3rd Grand Prix de Waregem
 3rd Gilbert Memorial Letêcheur Rochefort
 10th Omloop van het Waasland
2012
 1st Beverbeek Classic
 1st Grote Prijs Stad Geel
 3rd  Road race, UCI Under-23 Road World Championships
 7th Ronde van Drenthe
 9th Classic Loire Atlantique
 9th Internationale Wielertrofee Jong Maar Moedig
 10th Dwars door Drenthe
2013
 4th Châteauroux Classic
 6th Overall Arctic Race of Norway
 8th Druivenkoers Overijse
 9th Overall Tour des Fjords
 9th Halle–Ingooigem
2014
 1st Cholet-Pays de Loire
 1st Grote Prijs Beeckman-De Caluwé
 1st  Mountains classification, Vuelta a Andalucía
 2nd Nokere Koerse
 2nd Grand Prix de la Somme
 2nd Grand Prix de Fourmies
 2nd Grote Prijs Jef Scherens
 2nd Gooikse Pijl
 2nd Nationale Sluitingsprijs
 3rd Druivenkoers Overijse
 3rd Münsterland Giro
 4th Overall Tour de Wallonie
1st Stage 4
 4th Grand Prix Pino Cerami
 4th Arnhem–Veenendaal Classic
 4th Grand Prix d'Isbergues
 6th Overall Boucles de la Mayenne
1st  Points classification
 6th Gent–Wevelgem
 7th Dwars door Vlaanderen
 7th Omloop van het Houtland
 9th Grand Prix de Denain
 10th Kampioenschap van Vlaanderen
2015
 2nd Nationale Sluitingsprijs
 3rd Binche–Chimay–Binche
 4th Kuurne–Brussels–Kuurne
 4th Halle–Ingooigem
 6th Omloop van het Houtland
2016
 Tour du Poitou Charentes
1st  Points classification
1st Stage 2
 1st  Mountains classification, Arctic Race of Norway
 4th Grand Prix Impanis-Van Petegem
2018
 1st Grote Prijs Beeckman-De Caluwé
2019
 1st Binche–Chimay–Binche
 2nd Paris–Bourges
 3rd Grand Prix La Marseillaise
 3rd Druivenkoers Overijse
 3rd Omloop Mandel-Leie-Schelde
 4th Tour de l'Eurométropole
 5th Overall Four Days of Dunkirk
 7th Ronde van Limburg
 8th Grote Prijs Jef Scherens
2020
 7th Trofeo Campos, Porreres, Felanitx, Ses Salines
2021
 4th Bredene Koksijde Classic
 5th Nokere Koerse
 5th Grand Prix de Denain
 7th Gooikse Pijl
 8th Paris–Roubaix
 8th Grand Prix de Wallonie
2022
 10th Gooikse Pijl
2023
 7th Trofeo Palma

Grand Tour general classification results timeline

References

External links

 
 

1990 births
Living people
Belgian male cyclists
Sportspeople from Aalst, Belgium
Cyclists from East Flanders